Mount Carmel High School at Akola is a primary, secondary and higher secondary school in the Vidarbha region of Maharashtra, India. The school is affiliated to the Maharashtra State Board of Secondary and Higher Secondary Education, government of Maharashtra, India. It is administered and maintained by the Roman Catholic Diocese of Amravati. It is primarily a Catholic school, but is open to people of all faiths.

History
Mount Carmel School at Akola was established on 16 July 1977 by Rev. Fr. Nobert Braganza, under the guidance of Rev. Dr. Joseph Rosario (co-founder)of Mount Carmel High School the former bishop of Amravati.

Education
The school has Science Laboratories and Computer Labs. There is NCC for boys and girls, Scouts group for boys, Guides group for girls, Road Safety Patrol Troop for boys and girls and a Social Service Group. Scholarships are available on the basis of students academic record. The school has a drawing hall which is used as FSM class, auditorium and playground. The current principal of the school Rev Father Matthew Karickal.

Junior College
Mount Carmel Junior College, as a supplement to the secondary school, was opened to provide higher secondary education for Stds. XI and XII students.

References

External links

Memory Of Carmel

Catholic secondary schools in India
Primary schools in India
High schools and secondary schools in Maharashtra
Private schools in Maharashtra
Christian schools in Maharashtra
Education in Akola
Educational institutions established in 1977
1977 establishments in Maharashtra